The 1972 Little All-America college football team, also known as the College Division All-America football team, is composed of college football players from small colleges and universities who were selected by the Associated Press (AP) as the best players at each position. For 1972, the AP selected three teams, each team having separate offensive and defensive platoons.

First team

Offense
 Quarterback - Bob Biggs (senior, 6'0", 175), UC Davis
 Running back - Jimmy Edwards (sophomore, 5'10", 190), Northeast Louisiana
 Running back - Billy "White Shoes" Johnson (sophomore, 5'9", 170), Widener
 Running back - Mike Deutsch (senior, 6'2", 220), North Dakota
 Wide receiver - Roger Carr (junior, 6'3", 200), Louisiana Tech
 Tight end - James Moore (senior, 6'0", 191), McNeese State
 Tackle - David Taylor (senior, 6'5", 260), Catawba
 Tackle - Robert Woods (senior, 6'5", 248), Tennessee State
 Guard - Gary Kipling (senior, 6'3", 235), South Dakota
 Guard - Curtis Wester (senior, 6'4", 245), East Texas State
 Center - Bob Daigle (senior, 6'3", 230), Southwest Texas

Defense
 Defensive end - Joe Carpone (senior, 6'3", 215), Delaware
 Defensive end - Barney Chavous (senior, 6'4", 250), South Carolina State
 Defensive tackle - Gary "Big Hands" Johnson (sophomore, 6'3", 260), Grambling
 Defensive tackle - Alex Price (senior, 6'4", 280), Alcorn A&M
 Linebacker - Waymond Bryant (junior, 6'3", 235), Tennessee State
 Linebacker - Stan Cherry (senior, 6'4", 225), Morgan State
 Linebacker - Brian Kelley (senior, 6'3", 230), Cal Lutheran
 Linebacker - Jim Youngblood (senior, 6'3", 235), Tennessee Tech
 Defensive back - Mike Amos (senior, 6'3", 180), Cal Poly
 Defensive back - Steve Dennis (senior, 6'3", 170), Grambling
 Defensive back - Bruce Polen (senior, 6'0", 170), William Penn

Second team

Offense
 Quarterback - Joe Costner, Maryville
 Running back - Don Aleksiewicz, Hobart
 Running back - Johnny Baker, Ouachita Baptist
 Running back - Kenneth Parks, East Texas
 Wide receiver - Tim George, Carson-Newman
 Tight end - Ron Mayo, Morgan State
 Tackle - Bracey Bonham, NC Central
 Tackle - Paul Krause, Central Michigan
 Guard - David Nollner, Western Kentucky
 Guard - Bob Poss, Indiana State
 Center - Mark Walsh, Illinois Benedictine

Defense
 Defensive end - Ed "Too Tall" Jones, Tennessee State
 Defensive end - Archie Pearmon, Northeastern Oklahoma
 Defensive tackle - Dennis Johnson, Delaware
 Defensive tackle - Bill Kollar, Montana State
 Linebacker - Ron Klawitter, Wittenberg
 Linebacker - Steve Nelson, North Dakota State
 Linebacker - Larry Rawlinson, McNeese State
 Linebacker - Steve Yates, Western Carolina
 Defensive back - Mike Holmes, Texas Southern
 Defensive back - Doug Jones, Cal State-Northridge
 Defensive back - Don Walker, Central (Ohio)

Third team

Offense
 Quarterback - Kim McQuilken, Lehigh
 Running back - Harold Hill, Glassboro State
 Running back - Chuck Markey, Central Michigan
 Running back - Phil Pope, Middlebury
 Wide receiver - Chuck Cornell, Bridgeport
 Tight end - Bill Schlegel, Lehigh
 Tackle - Stan Durtan, Bucknell
 Tackle - Connie Wassink, Northwestern (Iowa)
 Guard - Joe Kotval, Buena Vista
 Guard - Marc Crevier, Ashland
 Center - Mike Evanson, North Dakota State

Defense
 Defensive end - Harvey Martin, East Texas
 Defensive end - Tom Ramsey, Northern Arizona
 Defensive tackle - Fred Dean, Louisiana Tech
 Defensive tackle - Mike Samples, Drake
 Linebacker - Wiley Epps, Kentucky State
 Linebacker - Mike Leidy, Hampden-Sydney
 Linebacker - Ken Pettus, Newberry
 Linebacker - Gary Weaver, Fresno State
 Defensive back - Dave Balmert, Indiana (Pennsylvania)
 Defensive back - Phil Borlas, Fresno State
 Defensive back - Tom Rezzuti, Northeastern

See also
 1972 College Football All-America Team

References

Little All-America college football team
Little All-America college football team
Little All-America college football teams